Sirajul Islam is a Jatiya Party (Ershad) politician and the former Member of Parliament of Netrokona-1.

Career
Islam was elected to parliament from Netrokona-1 as a Awami League and Jatiya Party candidate in 1986 and 1988 respectively.

References

Jatiya Party politicians
Living people
3rd Jatiya Sangsad members
4th Jatiya Sangsad members
Year of birth missing (living people)